This page is a timeline of digital preservation and Web archiving. It covers various aspects of saving and preserving digital data, whether they are born-digital or not.

Trends
Digital preservation encompasses a variety of efforts and technologies, so its history can be viewed through various trends in these separate efforts:

 File systems with built-in fault-tolerance
 Various changes in the physical storage used
 On-demand archiving services
 URL shortening services
 Various episodes of major archival work, sometimes as a result of services shutting down
 Efforts at converting physical/analog information to more modern digital media, file formats, and storage

Timeline

See also
 List of digital preservation initiatives
 List of Web archiving initiatives

References

Digital preservation
Technology timelines
Computing timelines